One Brickell Centre is a proposed 80 story, 1,040 ft (317 m) office skyscraper in the city of Miami, Florida. The tower would be part of the existing nine-acre Brickell City Centre development. If built, One Brickell City Centre would be the tallest building in Miami and the Southeastern United States, surpassing the Bank of America Plaza in Atlanta.  It would also surpass the height of the not yet constructed One Bayfront Plaza, which is approved at 1,010 ft (308 m) tall. Construction on the building is slated to begin in 2023.

History
In 2013, it was reported that if built the project would not be completed until at least 2018 and will cost roughly $1 billion U.S.D. to build.
The FAA has finally approved the 80-story height of One Brickell City Centre, which is now set to become one of the tallest buildings in the country.

In January 2015 the FAA announced that they would try to block the project unless they cut the height to 475 ft, though this was never finalized. June 24, 2015 federal officials determined a height of 1,040 feet above ground level, or 1,049 feet above sea level wouldn't pose a hazard to air navigation, and the project would legally be allowed to continue.

It is part of the mixed-use nine-acre Brickell City Centre development. The tower would also include a lounge on the 80th floor and a restaurant on the 79th floor.

The tower was redesigned in 2022 to be all office space with construction on the building slated to begin in 2023.

Design

It would be on Brickell Avenue adjacent to SW Eighth Street, and connected to the modified Eighth Street Metromover station as part of the first phase of Brickell City Centre. The 2022 redesign is for an all-office tower with 1.6 million square feet (148,600 m2) of space.

See also

Brickell City Centre
List of tallest buildings in Miami

References

Further reading
 
 ‘Climate ribbon’ will cool shoppers at Brickell City Centre. Miami Herald.
 Brickell City Centre tower nearly half sold. Miami Today.
 Saks Fifth Avenue will anchor Brickell City Centre. Miami Herald.
 One Brickell City Centre: Tallest Building in the Southeast. Miami New Times.
 Akerman LLP moving to Brickell City Centre. Miami Herald.
 Together, Swire, Whitmans developing retail side for Brickell CityCentre. Daily Business Review. 
 Cinemex movie theater coming to Miami’s Brickell City Centre. Miami Herald.
 Swire launches sales of Rise condo at Brickell City Centre. Miami Herald.
 New Brickell project wants a low profile for cars. Miami Herald.
 24hour Energy Forecast For Brickell Citicentre. Miami Today.
 Arquitectonica-designed tower planned at 700 Brickell. South Florida Business Journal.
 Swire releases new rendering for Brickell City Centre. South Florida Business Journal.

External links
 
 One Brickell City Centre Miami – Emporis listing

Office buildings in Miami
Skyscrapers in Miami
Proposed skyscrapers in the United States
Arquitectonica buildings